Actaea, officially (120347) Salacia I Actaea, is a natural satellite of the classical Kuiper belt planetoid 120347 Salacia. Its diameter is estimated , which is approximately one-third the diameter of Salacia; thus, Salacia and Actaea are viewed by William Grundy et al. to be a binary system. Assuming that the following size estimates are correct, Actaea is about the sixth-biggest known moon of a trans-Neptunian object, after Charon (1212 km), Dysnomia (700 km), Vanth (443 km), Ilmarë (326 km) and Hiiaka (320 km), but possibly also Hiisi (250 km).

Discovery and name

It was discovered on 21 July 2006 by Keith S. Noll, Harold Levison, Denise Stephens and Will Grundy with the Hubble Space Telescope. On 18 February 2011, it was officially named Actaea after the nereid Aktaia.

Orbit

The ratio of its semi-major axis to its primary's Hill radius is 0.0023, the tightest trans-Neptunian binary with a known orbit.

Physical characteristics
Actaea is  magnitudes fainter than Salacia, implying a diameter ratio of 2.98 for equal albedos. It has been calculated that the Salacia system should have undergone enough tidal evolution to circularize their orbits, which is consistent with the low measured eccentricity, but that the primary need not be tidally locked. Salacia and Actaea will next occult each other in 2067.

References

120347 Salacia
20060721
Discoveries by Denise C. Stephens